The 155 mm self-propelled gun Mk F3, or the Canon de 155 mm Mle F3 Automoteur (Cn-155-F3-Am), was developed in the early 1950s by the French Army to replace their American M41 Gorilla 155mm self-propelled guns. The Mk F3 is the smallest and lightest 155 mm motorized gun carriage ever produced, and because of its size and low cost it has found considerable success on the export market. Constructed on a modified AMX-13 light tank chassis, the Mk F3 is novel in incorporating room inside for only two of the eight required crewmen (the others riding in support vehicles). This allows the 155 mm gun to be placed on a smaller chassis than that employed by other armies, but exposes the outside crew members to enemy fire and other hazards.

Design

The Mk F3 is essentially a modified AMX-13 light tank chassis with the rear idler removed and the hull modified to accept a 155 mm cannon and its recoil, elevating and traversing mechanisms, including two rear spades which arereversed into the ground to give added stability when firing. The gun is accompanied by a 6x6 truck or an AMX-VCA that carries the rest of the 8-men gun crew and 25 projectiles.

The F3 fired the standard 155 mm high-explosive projectile, and is also capable of firing the smoke, illumination and rocket-assisted rounds. The effective range is 20,050 m with 43.75 kg HE rounds. 

The hull of the Mk F3 is of all-welded steel armour measuring 10 to 20 mm, providing the two occupants with protection from small arms fire and shell splinters. The layout is conventional, with the driver's compartment at the front on the left, engine compartment to the right and the 155 mm gun above at the rear. A splashboard is mounted at the front of the hull to stop water from rushing up the glacis plate when the vehicle is fording streams. A replacement road wheel is often carried on the glacis plate.  The driver has a single-piece hatch that opens to the left, and is provided with three daylight periscopes, the centre one of which is replaceable by an image intensification (or thermal) periscope for night driving. The commander is seated behind the driver and has a two-piece hatch that opens to either side. The commander is also provided with three daylight periscopes. The Mk F3 design lacks any sort of nuclear-biological-chemical (NBC) protection for its crew.

The torsion bar suspension consists of five single rubber-tyred road wheels with the drive sprocket at the front and the fifth roadwheel acting as the idler. There are three track-return rollers. The first and last road wheel stations have hydraulic shock-absorbers. The steel tracks can be fitted with rubber pads if required. Stowage containers are provided along each side of the upper part of the hull. Standard equipment includes a loudspeaker and a cable reel with 400 m of cable.

History

In the early 1950s the French Army desired to replace their aging American M41 howitzers with an indigenous design, based on the AMX-13 light tank chassis. The Mk F3 entered production in 1959. Its low cost and light weight made it a very popular weapon system on the export market. It was exported to a number of South American and Middle Eastern countries, and remained in production until the early 1980s, long after the French Army had themselves converted to the fully enclosed GCT 155mm self-propelled artillery system.

Production
The 155 mm gun, a derivative of the Obusier de 155 mm Modèle 50, was designed by the Atelier de Construction de Tarbes (ATS), and the chassis by the Atelier de Construction Roanne (ARE). Integration of the gun with the chassis and all firing trials were undertaken by the Etablissement d'Etudes et de Fabrications d'Armement de Bourges (EFAB). Because the ARE was tooling up for production of the AMX-30 main battle tank, production of the whole AMX-13 tank family, including the F3 155 mm self-propelled gun, was transferred to Mécanique Creusot-Loire. Total production of the Mk F3 amounted to 621 guns. Beginning in 1993, Mécanique Creusot-Loire became Giat Industries, and in 2006 was renamed Nexter. In 1997 France supplied the last 10 155 mm Mk F3 systems to Morocco.

Combat history 
It was used by Al Jahra Force during Kippur War on Syrian front. Morocco used its Mk F3 during Western Sahara War.

Iraq captured or destroyed 80 of these guns during the invasion of Kuwait.

Variants 
The Mk F3 has been offered by GIAT with Detroit Diesel 6V-53T and Baudouin 6F 11 SRY engines.
RDM Technology upgraded variant: in 1991, the Dutch company RDM Technology was contracted to upgrade 22 Mk F3s in service with Qatar. They were fitted with a Detroit Diesel Model 6V-53T turbocharged diesel engine and a new transmission.
 The CITER 155mm L33 gun reused many components of the Mk F3.

155 mm Mk F3 with 155 mm/39 calibre ordnance: proposed design with a longer gun.

Operators

Current operators 
 - 12
 - 10 or 12, 5 in service 
 - 18, in reserve in 2002
 - 98, 90 in service 
 - 28, 22 upgraded from 1991
 - 18
 - 6 or 10

Former operators 
 - 24 (until 2018)
 - 20 (8 purchased from France in 1970s and 12 second-hand units purchased from Belgium in 1990s.  All have been removed from service, replaced by 48 M-109)

 - captured from Kuwait.
 - 12
 - 12 to 20, replaced by 2S19 Msta-S

References

Notes

Bibliography

External links
 History, Characteristics & Photo Gallery - Site Chars Francais.net, retrieved 2009-03-08 

155 mm artillery
Tracked self-propelled howitzers
Cold War artillery of France
Military vehicles introduced in the 1960s